Kapcypridopsis barnardi is a species of ostracod crustacean in the family Cyprididae, subfamily Cypridopsinae. It is endemic to Table Mountain in South Africa.

References

 McKenzie, K.G. 1977: Illustrated generic key to South African continental Ostracoda. Annals of the South African Museum, 74 (3) 45-103.

External links

Cyprididae
Table Mountain
Endemic crustaceans of South Africa
Freshwater crustaceans of Africa
Taxonomy articles created by Polbot
Crustaceans described in 1977